Petar Krumov may refer to:
 Petar Krumov (composer)
 Petar Krumov (wrestler)